To pontikaki ("the little mouse"), also To pondikaki, is a 1954 Greek crime film directed by Nikos Tsiforos and starring Aliki Vougiouklaki, Dionyssis Papayannopoulos and Nikos Rizos.

Synopsis

Loukis after his lucky breaky up and decided to resign from the police, his luck on the young florist Krinio in which she was known as The Little Mouse.  They took along the hiding place in which they live with Vangelis, Christina and the leader of the council Kostas.  Loukis willed to overcome his costly road and they rented a bedroom.  They tried to return to his life especially The Little Mouse.  The same was also done by Petros.  Kostas was not disposed and made much difficult for the damaging his team.

Cast

Aliki Vougiouklaki ..... Krinoula
Giorgos Lefteriotis ..... Loukis
Dionyssis Papayannopoulos ..... Kostas
Nikos Rizos ..... Vangelis
Mimis Fotopoulos ..... Babis
Konstandinos Pappas ..... police captain
Rika Dialina
Periklis Christoforidis

Other information

Genre: Police comedy
Colour: black and white
Tickets: 32,558
Photographic manager: Kostas Theodoridis

Critics

Apogevmatini praised the movie as a great movie.

Police movies in Greece

The movie hides historically importance as the first police production in Greece in an era on the screen, as the police movies was thought as a cheap entrance.

External links

To pontikaki at cine.gr 

1954 films
1950s Greek-language films
Greek crime thriller films
1950s crime comedy films
1954 comedy films
Greek black-and-white films